Koshin Dam is a gravity dam located in Tochigi prefecture in Japan. The dam is used for power production. The catchment area of the dam is 272.2 km2. The dam impounds about 2 hectares of land when full and can store 195 thousand cubic meters of water. The construction of the dam was started on 1975 and completed in 1985.

References

Dams in Tochigi Prefecture
1985 establishments in Japan